Wildside is the fifth studio album by Canadian rock band Loverboy, released in September 1987. It was the band's first to not turn platinum, signalling a decline in their popularity.

Cash Box cited the "driving rock melodies" of the single "Love Will Rise Again", which "continues in band's established tradition of melodic power-rock".

Of the album, Musician reviewer J. D. Considine wrote simply: "Talk a walk."

Track listing

Personnel
All information from the album booklet.

Loverboy
 Mike Reno – lead vocals
 Paul Dean – guitar, backing vocals
 Doug Johnson – keyboards
 Scott Smith – bass
 Matt Frenette – drums

Additional musicians
 Darrell Mansfield – harp
 Alison Glass – voice on "That's Where My Money Goes"
 Paul Hyde – voice on "That's Where My Money Goes"

Production
 Neil Shilkin – programming
 Bruce Fairbairn – producer, backing vocals
 Bob Rock – engineer, mixing
 Mike Fraser – engineer
 Ed Thacker – mastering
 George Marino – mastering
 Norman Moore – art direction
 Phillip Dixon – photography
 James O' Mara – photography
 Ryan Begley – photography

Charts

Certifications

References

External links
 Loverboy- Wildside @Discogs.com

1987 albums
Loverboy albums
Albums produced by Bruce Fairbairn
Columbia Records albums